Skidd Mills is a songwriter/producer based in Nashville, Tennessee. Skidd began his career at Ardent Studios in 1991. There he learned from the likes of John Hampton, Joe Hardy, Jim Dickinson, and Paul Ebersold. In 2001, Skidd left Ardent and started 747 Studios with fellow producer Paul Ebersold. It was there that Skiddco Music was started. In 2009, Skidd moved his operation to Nashville, where he has studios in Nolensville and on Music Row. Skidd has spent his career as a songwriter, producer, mixer, and engineer in rock, country, pop, blues and Christian music.

In 2006, Skidd started Skiddco Music LLC. The production company's first signing was Mississippi rock act Saving Abel. After developing and writing with the band, Skiddco Music teamed up with Virgin Records and released their first self-titled CD. The CD was certified gold, and the first single, "Addicted" sold over 2 million. Other acts on Skiddco Music include Jared Blake, Billy Dawson, Ashla Taylor and Jared Weeks.

Awards
Skidd has won multiple Grammy Awards along with having seven Grammy nominations. In 2010, Skidd won a BMI Pop Award for "most played song" for co-writing Saving Abel's "Addicted". Skidd has multiple Dove nominations.

Selected discography
 Skillet – Collide (2003) *Grammy nominated
 Sister Hazel – Lift (2004)
 Saliva – Survival of the Sickest (2005)
 Third Day – Wire (2005) *Grammy winner
 Rev Theory – Truth Is Currency (2005)
 Kutless – Strong Tower (2005)
 Deepfield – Archetypes and Repetition (2006)
 12 Stones – Anthem for the Underdog (2007)
 Submersed – Immortal Verses (2007)
 Saving Abel – Saving Abel (2008)
 Pillar – Confessions (2009)
 Sick Puppies – Tri-Polar (2009)
 Decyfer Down - Crash (2009) *Grammy nominated
 Tetanus – Such a Loser (2010)
 Saving Abel – Miss America (2010)
 Since October – Life, Scars, Apologies (2010)
 Taddy Porter – Taddy Porter (2010)
 Brent James & the Contraband - Moment of Silence (2011)
 Egypt Central – White Rabbit (2011)
 Madam Adam – Madam Adam (2011)
 Pop Evil - War of Angels (2011)
 12 Stones - Only Human (2012)
 Charm City Devils - Sins (2012)
 Cavo - Thick as Thieves (2012)
 Saving Abel - Bringing Down the Giant (2012)
 12 Stones - Beneath the Scars (2012)
 We as Human - We as Human (2013) *Dove nominated
 The Letter Black - Rebuild (2013)
 Katie Armiger - Fall Into Me (2013)
 Devour the Day - Time & Pressure (2013)
 Texas Hippie Coalition - Ride On (2014)
 Charm City Devils - Battles (2014)
 Jared Blake - 'Til Morning Light (2014)
 Saving Abel - Crackin' the Safe (2014)
 Art of Dying - Rise Up (2015)
 Flaw - Divided We Fall (Co-producer with Rick Lander)
 12 Stones - Picture Perfect (2017)

References

External links 
 skiddco.com
 Skidd Mills - Credits: AllMusic 

Living people
Songwriters from Tennessee
Year of birth missing (living people)